Dąbrowski (feminine Dąbrowska, plural Dąbrowscy) or Dabrowski is the 11th most common surname in Poland (87,304 people in 2009); this is down from an apparent rank of 4th in 1990. Dąbrowski is a habitational name derived from the placename 'Dąbrowa' or 'Dąbrówka', which is used for several specific places in Poland or generically as "oak grove", the English meaning for these Polish words. Variants of the surname include Dombrowski, Dobrowski, and Dobrosky. Dobrowski also has an independent origin as a habitational name derived from the placename 'Dobrów'. The text-figure below summarizes the relationships among these various words. In other Slavic countries, the same surname takes the form Dubrovsky, as the Polish "ą" corresponds to "u" in most other Slavic languages.

Polish national anthem 
The Polish national anthem, Poland Is Not Yet Lost, is also known as Dąbrowski's Mazurka or Dombrowski's Mazurka.  The text references general Jan Henryk Dąbrowski, the founder of the Polish Legions in Italy.

Related surnames 
Polish "ą" (pronounced "om") corresponds to "u" in most other Slavic languages, i.e. Dąbrowski is equivalent to Dubrovsky in Ukraine and Russia. The latter countries also have forms such as "Dombrovsky" but at a lower frequency and often associated with Polish ancestry.

Frequency
The table below contains available information on the frequency of the Dąbrowski surname and variants in various countries across a span of years.

Notable people sharing the Dąbrowski surname or variants

Historically notable people
Dąbrowski
 Franciszek Dąbrowski
 Jan Henryk Dąbrowski (18th century), Polish general known for organizing the Polish Legions in Italy during the Napoleonic Wars
 Kazimierz Dąbrowski (20th century), Polish psychologist who developed the theory of Positive Disintegration
 Marian Dąbrowski (20th century), journalist and press magnate of the Second Polish Republic
Żądło-Dąbrowski z Dąbrówki h. Radwan noble family
 Jarosław Dąbrowski (19th century), Polish general depicted on the obverse of the 1976 200-zloty banknote

Other notable people
Dąbrowski/Dąbrowska

 Ania Dąbrowska (born 1981), Polish singer and composer
 Bartłomiej Dąbrowski (born 1972), Polish tennis player
 Damian Dąbrowski, Polish footballer
 Daniel Dąbrowski (born 1983), Polish sprinter
 Dorota Dąbrowska, Polish statistician
 Helena Dąbrowska (1923–2003), Polish actress
 Jerzy Dąbrowski (1899–1967), 20th century Polish aeronautical engineer
 Józef Dąbrowski (19th century Polish Catholic priest)
 Katarzyna Dąbrowska (born 1984), Polish television actress
 Krystyna Dąbrowska (born 1906), Polish sculptor and painter
 Krystyna Dąbrowska (born 1973), Polish chess player
 Maciej Dąbrowski (born 1987), Polish footballer
 Małgorzata Dąbrowska (born 1956), Polish historian and Byzantinist
 Maria Dąbrowska (1889–1965), 20th century Polish writer
 Marek Dąbrowski (born 1949), Polish fencer
 Martyna Dąbrowska (born 1994), Polish athlete
 Renata Dąbrowska (born 1989), Polish cyclist
 Roman Dąbrowski (born 1972), Polish footballer
 Włodzimierz Dąbrowski (1892–1942), 20th century Polish political activist
Dąbrowski → Dabrowski
 Christoph Dabrowski (born 1978), Polish/German footballer
 Gabriela Dabrowski (born 1992), Canadian tennis player
 Stanislawa Dabrowski (born 1926), Australian humanitarian
 Stina Lundberg Dabrowski (born 1950), Swedish journalist

Dąbrowski → Dobrowski
 Jody Dobrowski (1981–2005), English hate crime victim

Dąbrowski → Dombrowski
Andreas Dombrowski (1894–unknown), Czech WWI flying ace
Brandyn Dombrowski (born 1985), American professional football player
Daniel Dombrowski (born 1953), American philosopher and university professor
Dave Dombrowski (born 1956), American baseball executive
Chad Dombrowski (born 1980), American professional soccer player
Karl von Dombrowski (1872–1951), German animal and hunting painter
Neil Dombrowski (born 1984), American professional soccer player
Tighe Dombrowski (born 1982), American professional soccer player
Zeke Dombrowski (born 1986), American professional soccer player
James A. Dombrowski (1897–1983), American Methodist minister active in the civil rights movement of the 1950s and 1960s
Jan Dombrowski (1926–1992), Polish bobsledder
Jim Dombrowski (born 1963), American professional football player
Joe Dombrowski (born 1991), American professional cyclist for UCI ProTeam Cannondale-Garmin.
Lutz Dombrowski (born 1959), German Olympic track and field athlete
Sandra Dombrowski, Swiss ice hockey player and referee

See also
Dąbrowa (disambiguation)
Dąbrówka (disambiguation)
Dąbrowski (disambiguation)

Notes

References

 
 
 
 
 
 
  Note: Data is not complete, accounting for ~94% of the population in 1990.
  Note: Google searches were conducted against "site:scb.se" to verify availability of surnames online.
  Note: some sources place the date of publication at 1972, others at 1973.
 
 
  Book not available for review by editor; citation obtained from List of most common surnames.

Polish-language surnames